The National Emission Standards for Hazardous Air Pollutants (NESHAP) are air pollution standards issued by the United States Environmental Protection Agency (EPA). The standards, authorized by the Clean Air Act, are for pollutants not covered by the National Ambient Air Quality Standards (NAAQS) that may cause an increase in fatalities or in serious, irreversible, or incapacitating illness.

Maximum Achievable Control Technology standards
The standards for a particular source category require the maximum degree of emission reduction that the EPA determines to be achievable, which is known as the Maximum Achievable Control Technology (MACT) standards. These standards are authorized by Section 112 of the 1970 Clean Air Act and the regulations are published in the Code of Federal Regulations (CFR).

Pollutants
EPA regulates the following hazardous air pollutants with the MACT standards.

For all listings above which contain the word "compounds" and for glycol ethers, the following applies: Unless otherwise specified, these listings are defined as including any unique chemical substance that contains the named chemical (i.e., antimony, arsenic, etc.) as part of that chemical's infrastructure.

 X'CN where X = H' or any other group where a formal dissociation may occur. For example, KCN or Ca(CN)2
 Includes mono- and di- ethers of ethylene glycol, diethylene glycol, and triethylene glycol R-(OCH2CH2)n -OR' where
n = 1, 2, or 3
R = alkyl C7 (chain of 7 carbon atoms) or less; or phenyl or alkyl substituted phenyl
R' = H or alkyl C7 or less; or OR' consisting of carboxylic acid ester, sulfate, phosphate, nitrate, or sulfonate. Polymers are excluded from the glycol category, as well as surfactant alcohol ethoxylates (where R is an alkyl C8 or greater) and their derivatives, and ethylene glycol monobutyl ether (CAS 111-76-2).
 Includes mineral fiber emissions from facilities manufacturing or processing glass, rock, or slag fibers (or other mineral derived fibers) of average diameter 1 micrometer or less.
 Includes organic compounds with more than one benzene ring, and which have a boiling point greater than or equal to 100 °C. 
 A type of atom which spontaneously undergoes radioactive decay.

Pollution sources
Most air toxics originate from human-made sources, including mobile sources (e.g., cars, trucks, buses) and stationary sources (e.g., factories, oil refineries, power plants), as well as indoor sources (e.g., building materials and activities such as cleaning). There are two types of stationary sources that generate routine emissions of air toxics:
Major sources are defined as sources that emit 10 or more tons per year of any of the listed toxic air pollutants, or 25 or more tons per year of a mixture of air toxics. These sources may release air toxics from fugitive emissions (equipment leaks), when materials are transferred from one location to another, or during discharge through emission stacks or vents.
Area sources consist of smaller facilities that release lesser quantities of toxic pollutants into the air. Area sources are defined as sources that do not emit more than 10 tons per year of a single air toxic or more than 25 tons per year of a combination of air toxics. Although the emissions from individual area sources are often relatively small, collectively their emissions can be of concern, particularly where large numbers of sources are located in heavily populated areas.

EPA published its initial list of source categories in 1992. Subsequently the agency issued several revisions and updates to the list and the regulatory promulgation schedule. For each listed source category, EPA indicates whether the sources are considered to be major sources or area sources. The 1990 Clean Air Act Amendments direct EPA to set standards for all major sources of air toxics, and for some area sources that are of particular concern. EPA is required to review all source category regulations every eight years.

See also
Air pollution in the United States
Mercury and Air Toxics Standards

References

External links
 Hazardous Air Pollutants - EPA

Air pollution in the United States
Chemical safety
Emission standards
Hazardous air pollutants
Standards of the United States
United States Environmental Protection Agency